John David "Honey" Russell (May 31, 1902 – November 15, 1973) was an American basketball player and coach who was inducted into the Naismith Memorial Basketball Hall of Fame in 1964. He turned professional after his sophomore year of high school, and for the next 28 years he played for numerous early 20th century pro teams, including many in the American Basketball League. His career included over 3,200 pro games (a number that would take a modern NBA player 30–40 years to equal). He was the first coach of the NBA's Boston Celtics (1946–1948).

Russell coached basketball at Seton Hall University from 1936 to 1943 and again from 1949 to 1960. His teams won 294 games and lost 137. In 1940 and 1941, Seton Hall ran its winning streak to 43 games, a national record at the time. The 1952–53 team won the National Invitation Tournament at Madison Square Garden in New York City. That team won 31 games, including 27 in a row, while only losing 2 games.

Russell also was a scout in professional baseball, working for the Atlanta Braves, Montreal Expos and Chicago White Sox. Of the many players he signed, 23 made it to the major leagues, including the Joe and Frank Torre, Don McMahon, and Earl Williams.

Head coaching record

NCAA

BAA

|-
| align="left" |Boston
| align="left" |1946–47
| 60||22||38||||align="center" |5th in Eastern||—||—||—||—|| align="center" |Missed playoffs
|-
| align="left" |Boston
| align="left" |1947–48
| 58||20||38||||align="center" |3rd in Eastern||3||1||2|||| align="center" |Lost in Quarterfinals
|-
|-class="sortbottom"
| align="center" colspan="2"|Total
| 118||42||76|||| ||3||1||2||||

References

External links
 
 John Russell @ basketball-reference.com
 Honey Russell @ ProBasketballEncyclopedia.com

1902 births
1973 deaths
American Basketball League (1925–1955) coaches
American men's basketball coaches
American men's basketball players
Atlanta Braves scouts
Basketball coaches from New York (state)
Basketball players from New York City
Boston Celtics head coaches
Chicago Bruins coaches
Chicago Bruins players
Chicago White Sox scouts
Cleveland Rosenblums players
College men's basketball head coaches in the United States
Manhattan Jaspers basketball coaches
Milwaukee Braves scouts
Montreal Expos scouts
Naismith Memorial Basketball Hall of Fame inductees
New York University alumni
Original Celtics players
Paterson Crescents players
Player-coaches
Seton Hall Pirates men's basketball coaches
Seton Hall University alumni
Sportspeople from Brooklyn
Wilkes-Barre Barons players